The 1962 Daytona 500, was a NASCAR Grand National Series event that was held on February 18, 1962, at Daytona International Speedway in Daytona Beach, Florida.

It was won by Fireball Roberts driving a 1962 Pontiac. Roberts drove his famous number 22 to victory in three hours and 10 minutes. The race was run in its entirety without a single caution flag.  Roberts dominated the event by leading 144 of the 200 laps.  The win was Roberts' second victory of the season.

Speedweeks
This year's Speedweeks followed a familiar pattern, Fireball was the class of the field. he won the pole for his qualifying race in his Smokey Yunick prepared 1962 Pontiac and again led from flag to flag, averaging  over the 40 laps to set the all-time Grand National race speed record.

The Indy Invasion
For the top Indianapolis drivers, including the three previous winners of the Indianapolis 500--A. J. Foyt, Rodger Ward and Jim Rathmann—this was irresistible. They clamored to get the United States Auto Club (which had replaced the AAA as the nation's leading auto racing sanctioned body) to lift its ban on racing at Daytona, but USAC, which sanctioned the Indy 500, would not budge. It wanted the drivers to focus on its own stock car racing series. The Indy drivers would have to wait another year.

Race Day
A furious battle erupted right from the green flag. Five different drivers traded the lead during the first 50 laps, including Joe Weatherly, who had won his qualifying race. Few, if anyone, paid attention when the no. 52 Ford dropped out of the race on lap four with electrical problems. Behind the wheel was 22-year-old Cale Yarborough of Timmonsville, South Carolina, destined to finish last in the 48-car field.

The pitched battle at the front saw Roberts lead the 15th lap, Cotton Owens lead on lap 16, Junior Johnson on lap 17 and Roberts again on lap 18. The blistering pace allowed the front-runners to lap nearly the entire field. But Yunick's flat-out strategy caused Roberts to run out of gas twice in the early going. During pit stops, Roberts pulled down his window by hand, just like a passenger car driver, to accept a drink.

Not far behind the front-runners was Richard Petty. He took the lead for the first time on lap 42. Petty was in a Plymouth that had started 10th, but his car was at least  slower than Roberts' Pontiac. Petty's team decided to try Junior Johnson's 1960 race-winning strategy and stay with Roberts at all costs, to draft him incessantly and pit when he did. Lee Petty, still limping from his devastating 1961 crash, stalked the pits during the last , placed his hands on his lips, his cigar in his mouth, with his intention on watching the battle on the track.

But this time, Roberts would not be denied. Roberts won by 27 seconds. Petty finished second, becoming the only other driver on the lead lap.

It was Fireball's only Daytona 500 victory. He would die two years later from a fiery crash in the World 600.

References

Daytona 500
Daytona 500
NASCAR races at Daytona International Speedway
February 1962 sports events in the United States